Kim Krizan (born November 1, 1961) is an American writer and actress best known for originating the story and characters in the Before trilogy with her writing on Before Sunrise (1995) and Before Sunset (2004), for which she was nominated for an Academy Award for Best Adapted Screenplay and a Writers Guild Award. The trilogy is based on characters she created with Richard Linklater. Krizan currently resides in Los Angeles, where she writes and teaches writing courses, most notably at UCLA. In the fall of 2021, she launched a video based writing class on Patreon.

Life and career
Krizan was featured in Linklater's Slacker (1991) and Waking Life (2001).  She is known for her part in Dazed and Confused (1993) where she plays the high school teacher, Ginny Stroud. Krizan also appeared and wrote her monologue in Waking Life, which discusses language and love.

In 2007, Krizan was selected as spokesperson for the screenwriting software Final Draft. 

In 2008, Krizan’s sci-fi/horror comic book, “2061,” was published in Zombie Tales #1, 9, and 11, with all three installments collected into a stand-alone graphic novella entitled Zombie Tales 2061. In 2010, she also contributed the story “Of and Concerning the Ancient, Mystical, and Holy Origins of ... CBGBs” to issue #3 of the CBGB comic book miniseries.

In October 2012, Publishers Weekly spotlighted Krizan's self-publishing efforts on Kickstarter for her debut non-fiction book Original Sins: Trade Secrets of the Femme Fatale. The Kickstarter campaign was successfully funded in November 2012.

On September 27, 2013, Kim Krizan published an article on The Huffington Post revealing she had found a previously unpublished love letter written by Gore Vidal to the diarist Anaïs Nin. This letter contradicts Vidal's previous characterization of his relationship with Nin, showing that Vidal did have feelings for her that he later heavily disavowed in his autobiography, Palimpsest. Krizan did this research in the run up to the release of the latest volume of Nin's uncensored diary, Mirages, for which she wrote the foreword.

In 2019 Krizan published Spy in the House of Anaïs Nin, an examination of long-buried letters, papers, and original manuscripts Krizan found while doing archival work in Nin's Los Angeles home.  The book was designated a best seller in feminist literary criticism on Amazon.

In the fall of 2021, Krizan brought her writing class online with the debut of "The Magic Hour with Kim Krizan" hosted on Patreon.

Kim Krizan was a board member of The Anais Nin Foundation.

References

External links
 

American women screenwriters
Writing teachers
Living people
1961 births
21st-century American women